James L. Larson (September 17, 1931–January 6, 2021) was an historian and Professor Emeritus at the University of California, Berkeley.

Work 
Larson earned his PhD at Berkeley with a dissertation entitled, "Speculation and experience: an inquiry into systematic description in the work of Carl von Linne." He completed his dissertation in 1965. 

Larson is known for his work on the "early modern understandings of the natural and scientific world, and in particular, the work of Carl Linnaeus.

Books
 Reforming the North: The Kingdoms and Churches of Scandinavia, 1520-1545 (2010) Cambridge.
 Interpreting Nature; The Science of Living Form from Linnaeus to Kant. Baltimore: Johns Hopkins University Press, 1994.
 Reason and Experience. The Representation of Natural Order in the Work of Carl von Linné, University of California Press, Berkeley, 1971.

References

Historians of science
1931 births
2021 deaths
University of California, Berkeley College of Letters and Science faculty